Allan or Alan Grant may refer to:

Alan Grant 
 Alan Grant (American football) (born 1966), former American football cornerback
 Alan Grant (darts player) (born 1948), Australian former darts player
 Alan Grant (writer) (1949–2022), comic book writer
 Alan Grant (hurler) (born 1991), Northern Irish hurler 
 A. K. Grant (1941–2000), New Zealand humorist

Allan Grant 
Allan Grant (1919–2008), American photojournalist
Allan Grant (footballer) (born 1973), Scottish former footballer

Fictional 
 Alan Grant, fictional Scotland Yard detective, from a series of mystery novels by Josephine Tey
 Dr. Alan Grant, a character from the Jurassic Park book and film franchise
 Alan Grant, a character from the 2012 Canadian horror movie American Mary

See also
 Grant Allen (1848–1899), science writer and novelist
 Robert Allen Grant (1905–1998), US Representative and judge